Gaomi is a county-level city of eastern Shandong province, China, under the administration of Weifang City. It is the hometown of writer and 2012 Nobel Prize in Literature winner Mo Yan, who has set some of his stories in the region.

Administrative divisions 
Gaomi has three subdistricts and seven towns under its administration.

Subdistricts:

Chaoyang Subdistrict
Liquan Subdistrict
Mishui Subdistrict

Towns:

Climate

References 

Cities in Shandong
Weifang